Mansour Al-Rashidi is a Kuwaiti sport shooter. He was the 2018 Asian Games champion on the Men's skeet event.

References

External links
 

Kuwaiti male sport shooters
Living people
Asian Games medalists in shooting
Shooters at the 2018 Asian Games
1984 births
Asian Games gold medalists for Kuwait
Medalists at the 2018 Asian Games
Shooters at the 2020 Summer Olympics